The MRT Line 6 is Dhaka's first rapid transit line. It is the first of the Dhaka Metro Rail system and is operated by Dhaka Mass Transit Company Limited (DMTCL). The section from Uttara to Agargaon started operations in December 2022. By January 2023, trains stopped only at the terminals and Pallabi. The second phase, running from Agargaon to Motijheel is scheduled to open in December 2023. Finally, a 1.16 km extension to Kamalapur is expected to open in 2025.

History

Planning
In 2005, the World Bank published a study report, recommending that the government of Bangladesh build a mass transit system in Dhaka. In the same year, American consultancy firm Louis Berger Group prepared a strategic transport plan for Dhaka. The World Bank helped to develop this plan, which proposed the construction of three MRT lines in Dhaka. Three years later, the Japan International Cooperation Agency (JICA) joined the metro rail project. In the Urban Traffic Formulation Study, JICA considered MRT Line 6 the most profitable and important of the proposed lines. A feasibility study was conducted for the construction of this line in the financial year 2010–2011. In 2013, JICA hired a consultant and financed the construction of MRT Line 6. A draft route was mapped in 2011. According to this map, the line was supposed to be from Uttara to Sayedabad. Jamilur Reza Choudhury, chairman of the Review Committee of the Strategic Transport Plan, requested prime minister Sheikh Hasina change the route. Later, the route map was modified slightly to finalize the current route map. JICA wanted to build Uttara metro station above ground, and the remaining stations underground, but E. Sreedharan, an Indian mass transit expert, recommended building an entirely elevated line, as he believed an underground metro line would be to expensive to build and operate. This resulted in the current route, which is entirely on elevated track. On 28 December 2014, the conceptual design of Line 6 was created. A detailed design of the line was prepared in August 2016.

Construction

In 2016, the July 2016 Dhaka attack took place during the call for tenders for the construction of the line. The terrorist attack led to some companies withdrawing from the tender process due to security concerns. Seven Japanese officials associated with the project died in the attack. Six months later, with the assurance of the government, the contractors started the construction work. The proposed station at Bijoy Sarani was to be built in front of the Bangabandhu Military Museum, but due to the objection of the Bangladesh Air Force, it was planned to be built near the Jatiya Sangsad Bhaban. The lockdown imposed by the government during the COVID-19 pandemic halted construction for several months. However, when the government allowed work in accordance with the rules to prevent infection, construction work was resumed. On 29 August 2021, the trial run of the trains on the line under construction began. At that time, the construction progress of MRT Line 6 was 67%. Installation of all viaducts on the line was completed on 27 January 2022. As of November 2022, the construction progress was 84.22%, while the progress of the first phase from Uttara to Agargaon was at 95%. Train service between the two stations on this line started on 29 December 2022.

Opening

On 28 December 2022, the section between Uttara and Agargaon was inaugurated by prime minister Sheikh Hasina. The following day, public operations started with trains running non-stop between the two terminals. Service was initially limited to four hours a day, and no trains ran on tuesday. On January 25, Pallabi metro station was opened. From 1st March Mirpur-10 station, the fifth station of the Dhaka metro rail, was opened for commuters on Wednesday morning

Extension
The extension of MRT Line 6 from Motijheel to Kamalapur railway station was planned in 2019. However, Kajima said it would withdraw from building a multimodal transport hub in the station area if it plans to do so. As a result, DMTCL considered three optional proposals to Kajima for extending the line. The first proposal is to build a station on Line 6 above Kamalapur metro station on Line 1 which is underground. According to the second proposal they consider planning to build the station outside the station area. According to the third proposal, they will apply for land from the ministry of Railways for constructing the station. With that, the length of the line increases to about 21 km. The extension pushes the completion date for full construction to December 2025. The extension work started in January 2023.

Timeline
The following dates represent the dates the section opened to the public, not the private inauguration.

Stations

Operation

The line operates everyday from 8.30am to 12.30pm.

Rolling stock
The MRT Line 6 is served by 12 six-car trains, all of which are Kawasaki Heavy Industries commuter car sets. Each train car is 19.8m long, 2.95m wide, and 4.1m long, forming 120m long trains. The trains are powered by 1500 V DC via overhead line rail system, are air-conditioned and capable of traveling at up to 100 km/h.

Reservation for women
Dhaka Metro Rail has reserved an entire compartment only for women on each train.

Issue
DMTCL had a dispute with Dhaka North City Corporation authority in 2022 due to a lack of space for the MRT Line 6 station's landings and use of pavement space. As a result, DMTCL announced the acquisition of land for the landing space of stations. This announcement added some complexity to the construction project.

References

Dhaka Metro Rail
Rapid transit lines
2022 establishments in Bangladesh
Railway lines opened in 2022